The Cunningham Highway is a  national highway located in south-eastern Queensland, Australia. The highway links the Darling Downs region with the urbanised outskirts of  via Cunninghams Gap.

Thereafter, the Cunningham carries the National Highway 42 shield to its south-western terminus with the Leichhardt Highway at Goondiwindi. The majority of the Cunningham Highway is a single carriageway with freeway standard and 6-lane arterial road standard towards its north-eastern terminus, near Ipswich.

History
The highway is named in honour of the explorer and botanist Allan Cunningham who followed a route close to where the modern-day highway runs. In 1828 after discovering the route Cunningham sent a report to Governor Ralph Darling emphasising the economic benefits that a link between the coast and pastoral lands of the Darling Downs would provide. The first road between the coast and the Darling Downs was Spicers Gap Road developed in 1859, which crossed the range at Spicer's Gap and was suitable for the drays used at that time. Although Cunningham's Gap was known at that time, it was considered too steep a route for drays. With the opening of the Southern railway line between Toowoomba and Warwick in 1871, passenger and goods transport switched to the railways and Spicers Gap Road fell into disuse and was not well maintained due to the cost.

It was not until the advent of automobiles that a route through the steep Cunningham's Gap became feasible. The original road was built entirely by voluntary labour and Acting Queensland Premier, William Forgan Smith, officially opened on 11 June 1927, the 100-year anniversary of Allan Cunningham's supposed discovery of Cunningham's Gap. Actually, Cunningham discovered two gaps, Spicer's Gap on 11 June 1827 as he approached from the Darling Downs side and Cunningham's Gap on 21 August 1828 as he approached from Ipswich. However, Cunningham mistakenly believed he had found both sides of the same gap and not two different ones. This mistake was then perpetuated on the monument to Cunningham unveiled as part of the official opening of the road, as it gave 11 June 1827 as the discovery of Cunningham's Gap.

The road was plagued by problems during this embryonic stage with the Royal Automobile Club of Queensland announcing that the road was closed, less than one month after it was officially opened. In 1935, the Mains Road Commission upgraded the road to highway and named it the Cunningham Highway. The new sealed road through the gap was eventually opened in November 1949.

Route
From this point, the Cunningham heads south-west as the Cunningham Motorway, bypassing to the south the Ipswich central business district, the original path of the highway, now named Warwick Road.

Within close proximity of Goondiwindi, the Cunningham Highway links to the Newell, Leichhardt, and Barwon highways, with the Bruxner Highway nearby.

Towns on the Cunningham Highway
From northeast to southwest, the following towns and settlements are located on the Cunningham Highway:

 
 
 
 
 
 
 Goondiwindi

Upgrades

Highway upgrades
A lead project to plan and conduct upgrades to the highway, at a total cost of $212.5 million, was in the planning phase in November 2021. The $25 million intersection upgrade described below is included in this project.

Intersection upgrade
A project to upgrade the intersection with the New England Highway east of Warwick, at a cost of $25 million, was due for completion in August 2022.

Reconstruction works
A project to reconstruct sections of the highway at Cunninghams Gap following bushfire damage, at a cost of $84.27 million, was due to start construction in early 2022.

Safety upgrades
A project to identify safety issues and propose solutions between Warwick and Inglewood, at a cost of $275,000, was under way in January 2022.

Major exits and intersections

Gallery

See also

 Highways in Australia
 List of highways in Queensland

References

External links

Highways in Queensland
South East Queensland
Darling Downs